North Midlands 3 was a tier 11 English Rugby Union league with teams from Birmingham, Herefordshire, Shropshire and Worcestershire taking part.  Promoted teams moved up to North Midlands (South) 2 and since the cancellation of North Midlands 4 at the end of the 1991–92 campaign there was no relegation.  North Midlands 3 was cancelled at the end of the 2003–04 season with teams transferred into either North Midlands (South) 2 or North Midlands (North).

Original teams

When league rugby began in 1987 this division contained the following teams:

Birmingham City Officials
Birmingham Welsh
Five Ways Old Edwardians
Kynoch
Ledbury 
Old Griffinians
Old Moseleians
Redditch
Selly Oak
Warley
Yardley & District

North Midlands 3 honours

North Midlands 3 (1987–1992)

The original North Midlands 3 was a tier 9 league involving clubs from Birmingham and the West Midlands.  Promotion was to North Midlands 2 and relegation to North Midlands 4.

North Midlands 3 (1992–1993)

Restructuring of the Midlands leagues saw North Midlands 3 drop two levels to become a tier 11 league.  Promotion continued to North Midlands 2 and since the cancellation of North Midlands 4 at the end of the 1991–92 season there would be no relegation.

North Midlands 2 (1993–1996)

The top six teams from Midlands 1 and the top six from North 1 were combined to create National 5 North, meaning that North Midlands 3 dropped another level to become a tier 12 league.  Promotion continued to North Midlands 2 and there was no relegation.  At the end of the 1995–96 season North Midlands 3 was cancelled and all clubs transferred into North Midlands 2.

North Midlands 3 (1999–2004)

North Midlands 3 was reintroduced after an absence of three seasons - this time as a level 11 league.  Promotion was to North Midlands 2 and there was no relegation.  At the end of the 2003–04 season the division was cancelled for good and all teams transferred into either North Midlands (South) 2 or North Midlands (North).

Number of league titles

Birmingham Welsh (1)
Bredon Star (1)
Clee Hill (1)
Five Ways Old Edwardians (1)
Old Griffinians (1)
Selly Oak (1)
Solihull (1)
Stourbridge Lions (1)
Upton-upon-Severn (1)
Warley (1)
West Midlands Police (1)
Wulfrun (1)

Notes

See also
North Midlands 1
North Midlands 2
North Midlands 4
Midlands RFU
North Midlands RFU
English rugby union system
Rugby union in England

References

External links
 North Midlands RFU website

11
Rugby union in Herefordshire
Rugby union in Shropshire
Rugby union in Worcestershire
Sport in Birmingham, West Midlands
Sports leagues established in 1987
Sports leagues disestablished in 2004